Andrei Pranevich is a Belarusian wheelchair fencer. He represented Belarus at the 2016 Summer Paralympics held in Rio de Janeiro, Brazil and he won the gold medal in the men's épée B event.

References

External links 
 

Living people
Year of birth missing (living people)
Place of birth missing (living people)
Belarusian male épée fencers
Wheelchair fencers at the 2016 Summer Paralympics
Medalists at the 2016 Summer Paralympics
Paralympic gold medalists for Belarus
Paralympic medalists in wheelchair fencing
Paralympic wheelchair fencers of Belarus
21st-century Belarusian people